Humam is an Arabic name. Notable people with this name include:

 Abu Humam al-Shami, Syrian terrorist
 Al-Kamal ibn al-Humam, Egyptian jurist
 Hakim Humam, 16th century Mughal official
 Humam Hamoudi, Iraqi politician
 Humam Khalil Abu-Mulal al-Balawi (1977–2009), Jordanian terrorist
 Humam Tariq (born 1996), Iraqi football player